Imma flaviceps is a moth of the family Immidae. It is known from the Himalayas.

References

External links

Immidae
Moths of Asia
Moths described in 1874